Customs Cycling Team is an Indonesian UCI Continental cycling team established in 2017.

Team roster

References

UCI Continental Teams (Asia)
Cycling teams established in 2017
Cycling teams based in Indonesia